Nino Ramsby, born Nina Ramsby, is a Swedish singer-songwriter and musician from Stockholm. During the 1990s he was the vocalist and guitarist for the alternative rock band Salt. He was also part of the bands Baxter and Grand Tone Music. Ramsby was born to a Finnish mother and a Swedish father.

In 2006 Ramsby released an album titled Jazzen with Martin Hederos on Amigo. The album peaked at No. 36 on the Swedish Sverigetopplistan chart. In 2008 he released Du Har Blivit Stor Nu on Moserobie. He also plays and records with the Ludvig Berghe Trio.

Discography
2004: Visorna (with Martin Hederos)
2006: Jazzen (with Martin Hederos)
2008: Du Har Blivit Stor Nu

References

External links
 

Living people
Singers from Stockholm
Swedish LGBT singers
1972 births
Swedish people of Finnish descent
21st-century Swedish male singers